How Ridiculous is an Australian YouTube channel based in Perth, Western Australia. The channel's main personalities are Brett Stanford, Derek Herron and Scott Gaunson. , they have 15.5 million subscribers and more than 7.7 billion video views. They are mostly known for their trick shots and experiments involving dropping objects onto other objects from a great height, typically 45 meters (165 feet). Objects that have been dropped by the channel include, but are not limited to, bowling balls, basketballs, anvils, lifting stones, custom-made heavy metal objects such as giant darts and a Mjölnir-like hammer, household appliances, cars/motor vehicles, and even a small plane. The group also frequently devises interesting targets to drop said objects onto, such as RC car race tracks, giant axe blades, multiple cans of spray paint or silly string taped/grouped together, bedliner-covered obstacles, a bulletproof glass table, and pools full of oobleck.

How Ridiculous also operates a TikTok page, which had 14.6 million followers and over 300 million likes as of October 2022.

History
The group- whose members met at church- began in 2009, with trick shot videos made for fun in backyards, originally with 4th member Kyle Nebel. Historically, the trio's main stunts have been trick shots, finding creative ways to destroy objects, and throwing or dropping objects from great heights. Many of their videos since 2015 are recorded at the Gravity Discovery Centre at the Leaning Tower of Gingin. Recently, the group has also made several videos testing various objects' ability to be thrown through obstacles, such as weather balloons, panes of glass, and sheets of drywall. 

In late 2021, How Ridiculous began releasing a series of shorts on both YouTube and Instagram; some contain clips from longer videos, but most involve multi-step races where competitors must quickly complete challenges such as popping balloons, smashing glass, unlocking doors, and making basketball shots. These shorts, all less than a minute long, became instant viral hits across both websites, garnering hundreds of millions of views. Currently, How Ridiculous' most-viewed full-length YouTube video, uploaded November 2021, is a competition between the three stars at RAC Arena in Perth. Stanford, Gaunson, and Herron used various objects to attempt to pop multiple weather balloons in a row, filming the results on a Phantom Camera. The best performing objects were an arrow shot from a recurved bow, and a pile of screws thrown all at once, both of which popped 11 balloons. Besides Switzerland and RAC Arena, the group has filmed special videos in many locations in Australia and around the globe, such as Optus Stadium, Perth Motorplex, Texas, Los Angeles, Turkey, Lesotho, Dubai, Serbia,  and the Australian Outback.

On 19 October 2018, the group released another highly popular video, in which they dropped a giant metal dart onto a table of bulletproof glass from 45m up. The dart became embedded almost perfectly halfway through the glass, and the image was considered so artistic/iconic that the group saved the sheet of glass and dart as it was, later making a new table out of it which now sits at the Gravity Discovery Centre as an attraction. They also released a limited edition T-shirt of the visual of the dart stuck in the glass.

In recent years, the trio added a fourth member to the recurring team – Jack Wallace aka "Editor Jack", whose primary job is camerawork and post-production editing. However, he has appeared in person in several videos, most notably a video in which he showed his skills at speedcubing while riding a waterslide at Aquaventure in Dubai. The team have also had several friends, celebrities, and fellow YouTube stars occasionally assist with the videos. The most frequently recurring friends are named Harrison, Michael, and Big Nick, and guest appearances include Tiger Woods, Ernie Els, Mark Rober, Shadiversity, Team Edge, Matt Carriker, YBS Youngbloods, and Gabriel Conte. Mark Rober, in his appearance, helped the team build a two ton, Kevlar-and-steel trampoline which was featured afterwards in several videos. The trio also list a Tyrannosaurus rex test dummy that they call "Rexy" as an official team member. The test dummy has featured in many of their videos, mainly those shot at the Gravity Discovery Centre.

On 9 October 2020, How Ridiculous launched a spinoff channel titled HR Gaming, in which the trio, Editor Jack and his brother Toby Wallace competed in various games such as Among Us, Minecraft, Rocket League and Fortnite, often with secondary challenges to make playing the games more difficult. This second channel was not as successful as the main channel, and is currently inactive, the most recent video having been posted on May 7, 2021.  As of March 2023, the How Ridiculous team has not expressed any interest in reviving the HR Gaming channel.

Guinness World Records
The record was achieved by Stanford, who sunk the putt in question at the Point Walter golf course in Western Australia. The shot was covered in one of their videos, uploaded on 23 February 2017.

On 19 January 2018, How Ridiculous uploaded a video in which their basketball shot from  set the current record for "Greatest height from which a basketball is shot." This took place at the Maletsunyane Falls in Lesotho, Africa, and was achieved by Herron.

In a video released 27 August 2021, Stanford also attempted to set the Guinness World Record for "Greatest height from which a ping pong ball is tossed into a red plastic cup". How Ridiculous announced that the oversight was completely unintentional, and that they intend to try again at a later date with a correctly sized cup.

References



Australian YouTubers
YouTube channels launched in 2009
English-language YouTube channels
People from Perth, Western Australia